Toonglasa is a genus of true bugs in the family Blissidae. There is one described species in Toonglasa, T. forficuloides.

References

External links

 

Blissidae
Articles created by Qbugbot